Heriotdale is a suburb of Johannesburg, South Africa. The suburb lying south of Malvern and north of Rosherville, is an industrial area. It is located in Region F of the City of Johannesburg Metropolitan Municipality.

History
Prior to the discovery of gold on the Witwatersrand in 1886, the suburb lay on land on one of the original farms called Doornfontein. Before becoming a suburb, the area was mining land with the Heriot Mine opening in 1887. After the gold was exhausted in the mine, the land was proclaimed as a suburb in October 1946. The mine is said to have been named after the Scottish goldsmith George Heriot, the "Jingling Geordie" in Sir Walter Scott's novel The Fortunes of Nigel. Some experts, however, claim the mine was instead named after the village of Heriot in Midlothian, Scotland. This village was founded in 1164 as Herth, but its name was changed in 1198 to Hereget (from the Old English here-geat, meaning a break in a hillside through which troops could march.

Die myn se naam is na bewering afgelei van die Skotse goudsmid George Heriot (1563–1624), die "Jingling Geordie" in sir Walter Scott se roman The Fortunes of Nigel. Sommige kenners beweer egter die myn is genoem na Heriot in Midlothian, Skotland, ’n naam wat in 1164 voorkom as Herth en in 1198 as Hereget, wat daarop dui dat dit afgelei is van Ou-Engels here-geat, wat ’n gaping of opening in die heuwels waardeur ’n leër dalk kan beweeg"beteken.

Sources 
 Stals, Prof. Dr. E.L.P (ed.). 1978. Afrikaners in die Goudstad, vol. 1: 1886 - 1924. Cape Town/Pretoria: HAUM.

References

Johannesburg Region F